Michael Loubser (born 9 September 1990) is a South African first class cricketer. He was included in the Boland cricket team squad for the 2015 Africa T20 Cup.

References

External links
 

1990 births
Living people
South African cricketers
Boland cricketers
Western Province cricketers
Cricketers from Cape Town